Montaza Palace is a palace, museum and extensive gardens in the Montaza district of Alexandria, Egypt. It was built on a low plateau east of central Alexandria overlooking a beach on the Mediterranean Sea.

History
The extensive Montaza Palace grounds first had the Salamlek Palace, built in 1892 by Khedive Abbas II, the last Muhammad Ali Dynasty ruler to hold the Khedive title over the Khedivate of Egypt and Sudan. It was used as a hunting lodge and residence for his companion.

The larger Al-Haramlik Palace and royal gardens were added to the Montaza Palace grounds, being built by King Fuad I in 1932, as a summer palace. It is in a mixture of Ottoman and Florentine styles, with two towers. One of these towers rises distinctively high above with elaborated Italian Renaissance design details. The palace has long open arcades facing the sea along each floor.

President Anwar El-Sadat renovated the original Salamlek Palace as an official presidential residence.  It was most recently used by former president Hosni Mubarak.

Public access

The Al-Haramlik—Montaza Palace is a public museum of the Muhammad Ali Dynasty family history and objects d'art. The Salamlek Palace is now an adjacent hotel.

See also
 Ras Al Teen Palace
 Royal Jewelry Museum – Fatma Al-Zahra Palace

References

External links

Memphistours: The Montaza Palace royal gardens Park, Al-Haramlik Palace, and Salamlek Palace.

Museums in Alexandria
Royal residences in Egypt
Presidential palaces in Egypt
Palaces in Alexandria
Gardens in Egypt
Muhammad Ali dynasty
Italian Renaissance Revival architecture
Buildings and structures of the Ottoman Empire
Houses completed in 1892
19th-century architecture in Egypt